Lindinger is a Germanic and Scandinavian surname. Notable people with the surname include:

Eduard Lindinger (1915–2004), German Luftwaffe pilot
Herbert Lindinger (born 1933), German industrial designer

See also
Lininger

Germanic-language surnames
Surnames of Scandinavian origin